Vasile Florea (born 25 October 1967) is a Romanian table tennis player. He competed in the men's singles event at the 1996 Summer Olympics.

References

1967 births
Living people
Romanian male table tennis players
Olympic table tennis players of Romania
Table tennis players at the 1996 Summer Olympics
Sportspeople from Craiova